2000 AD is a 2000 Hong Kong action film directed by Gordon Chan, who also wrote the screenplay with Stu Zicherman, produced by John Chong, Solon So and David Leong. The film stars Aaron Kwok, Phyllis Quek, James Lye and Daniel Wu. The film was shot on location in both Hong Kong and Singapore. The film was released theatrically in Hong Kong on 3 February 2000. It was timed to screen during the peak Chinese New Year period.

Plot

A private plane belonging to the TDX company is shot down over Singapore by a rogue agent from the CIA, Kelvin Woo. The company president was coming to investigate a stolen computer protection system. Kelvin has a programmer, Alex, plant a bug in the 1st National Bank's computer system, but he still needs a "Caller Program" to wipe the systems before they can rob the bank.

Colonel Ng, head of the Army's Information Warfare Unit, recruits Major Eric Ong from the Singapore Police to investigate the plane shooting independently from the US authorities. Eric is sent to Hong Kong to quietly observe. In Hong Kong, brothers Peter and Greg Li are computer programmers. However, Peter's girlfriend Janet and her brother Bobby live with them. Greg calls his girlfriend, Salina. She tells him that her office was raided by the CIA.

Ronald Ng of the Hong Kong Police Force Government Security Unit raids Greg's home, with him are Kelvin and his accomplice, representing the CIA. Eric watches from the street. While searching, an emp bomb is triggered, which disables all the electronics in the house. The brothers are arrested, and an American diplomat interrogates Greg while Ronald listens in. It turns out Greg is a CIA agent and asked for help from the embassy. Greg suspects the CIA has been compromised and that TDX may be implicated. Kelvin finds Greg's computer was wiped clean by the ion bomb. Peter is released, but Greg is to be deported back to the States.

As the vehicles leave the embassy, Peter sees his brother and waves goodbye. Suddenly, a rocket hits one of the vehicles, flipping it on to Greg's vehicle. All the officers are killed by sniper fire. Kelvin, in the car behind Greg's, sits quietly while everyone else panics. A devastated Peter follows Ronald as he chases the sniper but find himself running ahead of the officers. The sniper fires at Peter until he runs out of bullets. Meanwhile, Peter knowing the sniper is out, attacks him. Kelvin arrives and is about to shoot Peter when PTU officers show up. Kelvin then pretends to help Peter while the sniper escapes. Kelvin offers his help and gives Peter his number.

As Peter drives home with Janet, he notices a car following them. He confronts the driver, who turns out to be Eric. He reveals he is a Singaporean agent and asks Peter to help him investigate his brother's death. When Peter gets home, he finds that the house is swarming with police as part of the investigation. An officer breaks a large vase, spilling coins all over the floor. Salina arrives with her friend, a judge, who prevents further searching. When the coins are later cleaned up, a key to Greg's safe deposit box is found. Salina advises Peter to check the contents right away. She helps him forge his brother's identity, and they find it holds a metal briefcase. They take the briefcase but are arrested by Ronald outside the bank.

While being driven away the GSU vehicles are attacked by assailants trying to steal the briefcase. In the gun battle several are killed, including Ronald. Just before he dies, Ronald warns Peter about Salina. Peter is forced to kill an assailant, while the sniper from earlier is stopped by Eric, who had just arrived. In the car, Salina opens the briefcase and finds a safe deposit box key for the Singapore National Bank. Peter decides to go to Singapore with Salina, despite Eric's objections. Eric tells Colonel Ng he believes the GSU were attacked by Kelvin, while confirming Peter's innocence and his suspicions about Salina. Colonel Ng is upset about his involvement in the gun battle and demands he returns to Singapore.

Peter's locks the key in the hotel room's safe. He obviously distrusts Salina, while she becomes colder. They have a confrontation over dinner and Peter demands to know her identity. However, Salina tearfully reveals her car thief skills from being a hooker in a night club, where she met Greg.

On the following morning, Salina and the key are missing. The others rush to the bank, where they see Salina leaving the bank, accompanied by the man Peter recognises as the sniper who shot his brother. The two leave in a red vehicle, while the others rush out to get help from some nearby policemen. Frustrated, Peter steals the police car while Bobby stops the policeman, who calls for backup. Eric hears the radio message and rushes to the scene. Peter chases the car to the Boat Quay, where he rams it.

Eric and three other officers intercept the sniper's car and have a gun battle. As Peter reaches the scene, Salina fires at his feet to stop him. A speedboat is hijacked and all three, including Salina, escape up the Singapore River. Eric tells Peter and his friends that they need to go back to Hong Kong and Eric asks Peter not to reveal his identity.

The contents of the safe are shown to Kelvin, but it only contains items of sentimental value to Salina. Disgusted, he reminds her that she belongs to him, she was the one who stole the Caller Program. He threatens to kill her, erasing all evidence. At the airport, Bobby finds a mysterious program implanted on his laptop. Alex successfully completes the Caller Program, and destroys the data for several organisations, including the Stock Exchange and National Bank, their intended target. Kelvin is upset that the second part will take a month to finish. He gets a call from an unsuspecting Peter, who tells him about the program in Bobby's laptop and asks for his assistance.

They arrange to meet at a hotel, where the sniper is positioned on a nearby rooftop. A waiter offers them water and Peter is surprised to see it is Eric. With increased confidence, he demands information on Salina and his brother's killer. Kelvin asks that they move to a quieter area. While on the way out, he pokes gun in Peter's back, who finally realises who his brother's killer really is. Eric pursues and they fight on the hotel roof. The sniper pins Eric down. As they fight for the laptop, Peter falls off the roof, but is saved by a window washing platform, while Kelvin escapes with the laptop. Bobby sees Kelvin leaving and tails him in a taxi.

Kelvin and two agents arrive at Suntec City, where they meet Salina and four others. Bobby calls Peter to tell him where they are, but he loses the agents, only to be captured by them later. Peter and several officers arrive at the Convention Centre, but Eric receives a call from Colonel Ng, who surprises him by asking him to arrest all the American agents. He has confirmation that they are operating without approval. The agents find Alex at his computer where he reports he completed his task. Kelvin shoots him and is about to shoot Bobby when Salina points her gun at Kelvin. As the other agents react, one of them, who was sympathetic towards Salina, stops them. Salina and Bobby leave with the laptop.

Eric and his men cover the exits. Salina and Bobby stay among the exhibits, while rogue agents hunt for them. Bobby tells Peter their location and they rush in to help. Kelvin sees the officers and Peter converging on Bobby's hideout. Kelvin and the sniper sneak up on Bobby and Salina, who start to struggle, causing Bobby to be shot by Kelvin, sparking mayhem. In the chaos Eric manages to gun down several CIA agents while Kelvin grabs the laptop and tries to escape. He takes some civilians hostage and forces them to run the software. He shoots a hostage and the police are forced to withdraw.

In a fit of rage, Peter rushes Kelvin and is shot. He aim his gun at Kelvin, but hesitates and Kelvin triggers the program's deletion process, which reveals a snapshot of Peter and Bobby, a hoax they planted instead of the program. Peter takes a shot at Kelvin, but the gun jams. The closing scenes show Peter with paramedics outside the Convention Centre. Eric tells Peter he is lucky the gun jammed otherwise he would have been a murderer. Kelvin is assumed to be arrested and the sniper is seen quietly walking away from the crowd. Salina compliments Bobby for his bravery while on the way to the hospital.

Cast
 Aaron Kwok as Peter Li
 Daniel Wu as Bobby
 Phyllis Quek as Salina
 James Lye as Eric Ong a Singaporean Special Agent
 Gigi Choi as Janet
 Andrew Lin as Kelvin Woo a Rogue CIA Agent
 Ray Lui as Greg Li
 Francis Ng as Ronald Ng the Hong Kong Police Force Government Security Unit leader
 Ken Lo as Sniper
 Cynthia Koh as Theresa
 Kwan Yung as CIA hitman
 Cheung Wai as Mike
 Thomas Hudak as U.S. diplomat
 Wong Dik-gei as CIA hitman

Awards
20th Hong Kong Film Awards – Best Supporting Actor (Francis Ng)
7th Annual Hong Kong Film Critics Society Awards - Best Actor (Francis Ng)
Golden Bauhinia Awards - Best Supporting Actor (Francis Ng)

References

External links
 
 
Movie review 

2000 films
2000 action thriller films
2000s Cantonese-language films
Films about terrorism in Asia
Films directed by Gordon Chan
Films scored by Shigeru Umebayashi
Films set in Hong Kong
Films shot in Singapore
Hong Kong action thriller films
2000s Hong Kong films